Vargfors Hydroelectric Power Station is a run-of-the-river hydroelectric power plant on the Skellefte River in Västerbotten County, Sweden. About 15 km southwest of Vargfors is the urban area Norsjö.

The power plant was operational in 1961. It is owned and operated by Vattenfall.

Dam
Vargfors Dam consists of one concrete arch dam and two additional embankment dams.

Power plant 
The power plant contains 1 Francis- and 1 Kaplan turbine-generator. The total nameplate capacity is 122 MW. Its average annual generation is 452 GWh. The hydraulic head is 49 m. Maximum flow is 136 m³/s.

See also

 List of hydroelectric power stations in Sweden

References

External links 

 

Dams in Sweden
Hydroelectric power stations in Sweden
Gravity dams
Dams completed in 1961
Energy infrastructure completed in 1961
1961 establishments in Sweden